Nešto lijepo treba da se desi (trans. Something good needs to happen) is the fourth studio album released by the former Yugoslavia's Merlin band. The album was released in 1989.

Of all the tracks in this album, only the song "Ne plači mati" did not make it as a "Greatest Hit". The most famous song on this album is "Bosnom behar probeharao". The other hit song was "Kad zamirišu jorgovani" which was also a hit for Vesna Zmijanac. The last single of this album was "Je l' Sarajevo gdje je nekad bilo?"

Track listing

Note
 The song "Mjesečina" contains samples from and is inspired by "Where Did I Go Wrong", as written and performed by the British reggae band UB40.

External links
Nešto lijepo treba da se desi on Dino Merlin's official web site

Dino Merlin albums
1989 albums